Robert "Bob" Heard (born 9 February 1949) is a former Australian rules footballer who played with Collingwood and Richmond in the Victorian Football League (VFL) during the 1970s.

Heard began his senior career in the Victorian Football Association with the Preston Football Club. Heard won back-to-back Division 1 premierships with Preston in 1968 and 1969, and was one of the best on the ground in the 1968 Grand Final.

Heard moved to Collingwood in the Victorian Football League in 1970. Standing at 202 cm, Heard is believed to have become Collingwood's tallest ever player when he made his league debut in 1970. A tap ruckman, he started on the bench as 19th man in the 1970 VFL Grand Final, which Collingwood lost to Carlton and although he never played in a premiership team he took part in nine finals during his time at the club. Heard was also handy when rested in the forward line and kicked 32 goals in 1974.

He spent his final four VFL season at Richmond before rejoining his original club Preston.

References

Holmesby, Russell and Main, Jim (2007). The Encyclopedia of AFL Footballers. 7th ed. Melbourne: Bas Publishing.

External links

1949 births
Living people
Australian rules footballers from Victoria (Australia)
Collingwood Football Club players
Richmond Football Club players
Preston Football Club (VFA) players